András Toma (5 December 1925 – 30 March 2004) was a Hungarian soldier taken prisoner by the Red Army in 1945, then discovered living in a Russian psychiatric hospital in 2000. He was probably the last prisoner of war from the Second World War to be repatriated. 

Because Toma never learned Russian and nobody at the hospital spoke Hungarian, he had apparently not had a single conversation in over 50 years, a situation of great interest for the fields of psychiatry and psycholinguistics.

Life
Toma lost his mother when he was four years old. He lived in the hamlet of Sulyánbokor, near Nyíregyháza, when he was drafted in 1944. His regiment fought around Auschwitz and Kraków. Toma was captured on 11 January 1945 and taken through Ukraine and Belarus to the Boksitogorsk (Бокситогорск) camp near Saint Petersburg. Due to illness, he was taken from Boksitogorsk to a military hospital at another camp in Bistrjag (Быстряги) 1,000 km further east. In January 1947, he was transferred to a psychiatric hospital in Kotelnich (Котельнич). Since those in hospitals were removed from prisoner of war lists, Toma was lost to Hungarian authorities. He was declared dead in 1954.

Toma lived under the name András Tamás (Андраш Тамаш). A Czech linguist of Slovak descent, Karol Moravčík, identified him as Hungarian, and on 11 August 2000, Toma arrived back in Hungary where his family was identified through DNA matching. Toma was promoted to sergeant major by the Minister of Defense, and since his military service had been continuous, his decades of accumulated unpaid salary were paid in full. Toma, then aged 74, moved in with his half-sister Anna, who cared for him until his death in 2004.

References

Psychiatric ward POW may not have been alone

1925 births
2004 deaths
People from Újfehértó
Hungarian soldiers
Hungarian prisoners of war
World War II prisoners of war held by the Soviet Union